Pearl of Africa Uganda Rally or Pearl of Africa Rally Uganda (PoARU) is one of the main motorsport events in Uganda. It is part of the National Rally Championship and the FIA African Rally Championship (ARC).

Origins

The first edition of the Pearl of Africa Rally was held in 1997 as an African Rally Championship candidate event. This followed the successful organisation of Burundi's Great Lakes Rally in Uganda in 1996. The Great Lakes Rally was moved to Uganda due to political instability in Burundi. Inspired by the success of the Great Lakes Rally, Uganda decided to apply for its own African Rally Championship event in 1997.

As Winston Churchill visited Uganda, he baptised the country as the ‘Pearl of Africa’, that's where this event receives its name from.

Some remarkable drivers in the history of Uganda are Sospeter Munyegera, Shekhar Mehta, Satwant Singh, Charlie Lubega, Moses Lumala, Emmanuel Katto and Chipper Adams, among others.

Past winners of Pearl of Africa Rally

Source: Motor Sport Uganda  and African Rally Championship

References

External links 
 African Rally Championship
 FIA - African Rally Championship
 Uganda Motorsport

Rally competitions in Uganda
Sport in Uganda
Recurring sporting events established in 1997
1997 establishments in Uganda
Motorsport in Africa
Pearl